Tripos elegans is a species of dinoflagellates in the family Ceratiaceae.

References

External links 

 Tripos elegans at the World Register of Marine Species (WoRMS)
 Tripos elegans at AlgaeBase

Gonyaulacales
Protists described in 2013